Yang Hyun-suk (born January 9, 1970) is a South Korean music executive, rapper, dancer, songwriter, and record producer. He rose to fame as a member of Seo Taiji and Boys during the 1990s. After the group disbanded, he founded and became the Executive producer & Chairman of YG Entertainment, one of three biggest record companies in South Korea.

Career

1992-1996: Seo Taiji & Boys 

Seo Taiji & Boys was formed in 1991 with Seo Taiji, Lee Juno and Yang Hyun-seok. Yang said he first met Seo when the musician came to him to learn how to dance. "Blown away" by his music, Yang offered to join the group and they later recruited Lee who was one of the top dancers in Korea. The group was influential on the Korean music scene, famous for their single, "Nan Arayo" ("I Know"). The group received criticism for various albums, most notably for the song, "Shidaeyugam" ("Regret of the Times"), to which the fan backlash led to the abolishment of the Pre-censorship law in 1996.The group disbanded in 1996, with each member pursuing solo activities.

1996-2019: YG Entertainment 

In 1996, he established YG Entertainment and released his first solo album which featured a song composed by Seo Taiji. This was their first collaboration since the breakup. Yang Hyun-Suk has produced hugely successful artists under his company, most notably Jinusean, 1TYM, Wheesung, Gummy, Seven, Big Bang, 2NE1, Winner, iKon, Tablo, Epik High, Lee Hi, Blackpink, Treasure (band) and Psy.

Due to recent controversies involving the Burning Sun scandal and other allegations, Yang Hyun-suk announced his plans to step down from all of his positions at YG Entertainment, and his brother Yang Min-suk announced his decision to resign as CEO of YG Entertainment on June 14, 2019.

2023-present: YG Comeback
On December 22, 2022, Yang was acquitted from charges pressed against him and during the first day of 2023, he appeared in a teaser video of YG's newest girl group, Baby Monster, six years after the debut of Blackpink as part of the "YG Next Movement" project.

Personal life 
In March 2010, Yang revealed that he knew former Swi.T member Lee Eun-ju, who is 12 years his junior and the younger sister of Sechs Kies member Lee Jai-jin, for nine years. They married in the same year. Yang and Lee have two children together, Yoo-jin and Seung-hyun.

Discography

Albums 
 Yang Hyun-Suk (1998)

Filmography

TV Series

Awards

State honors

Notes

References

External links 
 Yang Hyun Seok Official website

1970 births
Living people
20th-century South Korean male singers
Musicians from Seoul
South Korean breakdancers
South Korean chief executives
South Korean hip hop record producers
South Korean hip hop singers
South Korean male rappers
South Korean music industry executives
South Korean Roman Catholics